Bachelors' Love is a 2013 Chinese romantic comedy film directed by Liu Cunming and written by Cai Dongliang. The film stars Jill Hsu, Chen Hao, and Zhou Zhi. It was released in China on November 8, 2015.

Cast
 Jill Hsu as Ka Xiaorou, a female film producer.
 Chen Hao as Yao Butong, a writer who suffers from acrophobia.
 Zhou Zhi as Xin Xiaoran

Other
 Michele Wang as Lin Xiaoyu
 Kong Ergou as Lang Youcai
 Mao Junjie as Zhi Xiaoya
 Daniella Wang as Mo Xiaomo
 Xie Wenxuan as Yun Xiaoxue

Production
Principal photography started on June 10, 2013, in Tangshan, Hebei.

Release
The crew hold a press conference at the Hundred Flowers Awards in Wuhan, capital of central China's Hubei province, on September 27, 2013, they announced that the film' theatrical release will be on November 11, during the Singles Day.

The film was released on November 8, 2015.

The film received mainly positive reviews.

References

External links
 
 

Films shot in Hebei
Chinese romantic comedy films
2013 romantic comedy films
2013 films